Breakabeen Historic District is a national historic district located at the hamlet of Breakabeen in Schoharie County, New York.  The district includes 33 contributing buildings.  Most of the buildings were built in the early to mid-19th century in a vernacular Greek Revival style.  Several buildings are temple-like featuring one or two story high portico supported by square columns.  The most interesting structure is a post American Civil War hotel.  It is a  large, square, two story building with a flat roof, exhibiting a variation of an Italian Villa theme.

It was added to the National Register of Historic Places in 1974.

Gallery

References

Historic districts on the National Register of Historic Places in New York (state)
Historic districts in Schoharie County, New York
National Register of Historic Places in Schoharie County, New York